Donald Joseph Leo Pelletier (June 17, 1931 – June 4, 2022) was an American Catholic prelate.

Biography 
Pelletier was born in Blackstone, Massachusetts, and was ordained to the priesthood for the Missionaries of La Salette. He served as bishop of the Diocese of Morondava, Madagascar, from 2000 until his retirement in 2010. He celebrated the 60th anniversary of his priesthood in 2016.  

Pelletier died as a result of being struck by a car in Enfield, New Hampshire.

References 

1931 births
2022 deaths
People from Attleboro, Massachusetts
American Roman Catholic bishops
Roman Catholic bishops of Morondava
Bishops appointed by Pope John Paul II
Road incident deaths in New Hampshire